Laurynas Grigelis and Uladzimir Ignatik were the defending champions, but chose not to compete.
Sanchai Ratiwatana and Sonchat Ratiwatana defeated Philipp Marx and Florin Mergea 7–5, 6–4 in the final to win the title.

Seeds

Draw

Draw

References
 Main Draw

Challenger La Manche - Doubles
2013 Doubles